The Rainiai massacre was the mass murder of between 70 and 80 Lithuanian political prisoners by the NKVD, with help from the Red Army, in a forest near Telšiai, Lithuania, during the night of June 24–25, 1941. It was one of many similar massacres carried out by Soviet forces in Lithuania, and other parts of the Soviet Union, during June 1941. Several thousand people were killed in these massacres. The Rainiai massacre was far from the largest of these massacres, but it is one of the best-known, due to the brutality and tortures inflicted on the victims by the perpetrators. Similar atrocities were committed in other places, like the Tartu massacre, in which almost two hundred people were murdered.

Massacre

A decision had been made to carry out the massacre after the June Revolt had taken place, during which the Lithuanian Activist Front had deposed the Soviet government in Lithuania,  and Nazi Germany had invaded the Soviet Union. The Soviet authorities were unable to evacuate the inmates (political prisoners) of the Telšiai prison, but they did not want to abandon them, as the inmates would then have been freed by the local population or by the Germans. Therefore, a punishment squad of the Red Army led by Dontsov  was called in to "liquidate" them.

Most of the prisoners were put into trucks during the night of June 24 and taken to the Rainiai forest where they were tortured and killed.  Many of the victims were so mutilated that only twenty-seven bodies could be identified after they were exhumed, only three days later.

According to the coroner's examination after the exhumation, both the report and the testimonies of witnesses, concurred that the Soviets cut off tongues, ears, genitals, scalps, put genitals into mouths, picked out eyes, pulled off fingernails, made belts of victims' skins to tie their hands, burned them with torches and acid, crushed bones and skulls, all done while the prisoners were still alive. The organizers of the massacre included Pyotr Raslan, Boris Mironov, Nachman Dushanski, political leader of 8th border army Mikhail Kompanyanec, NKVD Kretinga county deputy director Yermolayev, NKVD lieutenant Zhdanov and others.

Victims

Most of those who were killed in the Rainiai massacre had been arrested for political reasons from the time when Lithuania was occupied by the Soviet Union in 1940. Some of them, like Vladas Petronaitis, were arrested for their roles in the independence struggle or their societal roles in independent Lithuania ("intellectuals", politicians, lawyers, policemen and public servants).  Some had been arrested as "enemies of the revolution" for their business interests, land ownership or savings, as Soviet propaganda taught that businessmen and landlords were thieves and oppressors. Other people were arrested for possession of non-communist literature (such as books which supported the idea of independent Lithuania or were written by authors considered to be in the wrong by the Soviets), owning a Lithuanian flag, not giving their crops to the Soviet authorities, and similar "crimes". Others had been arrested without any evidence, because their friends had been arrested or because someone had "denounced" them. This group included mainly younger people, such as students from the Telšiai Crafts School (aged 18 – 19), and young people from the villages around Telšiai. Many were arrested for having been members of certain parties and organizations such as Boy Scouts. Some of the youth had been preparing for an anti-Soviet rebellion. These people were not tried, but were held in the Telšiai prison until the time it was decided to carry out the massacre. While most of the prisoners of the Telšiai prison were killed in the massacre, a few were released prior to the massacre.

After the massacre

When the bodies of those killed in Rainiai were exhumed and reburied after the Soviets retreated from the country, the funeral turned into a mass demonstration against the former Soviet occupation.

Both the German and Soviet occupying forces tried to use the events for propaganda purposes. Since several of the organizers and perpetrators were Jewish, the Nazi German occupying force produced propaganda blaming Jewish Bolshevik activists for the massacre. Perversely, in 1942, Soviet planes dropped propaganda pamphlets in Samogitia asking Who are those "Bolshevik martyrs"? and blaming German forces for the massacre.

The local citizenry were well aware of the Soviet responsibility and in 1942, planned to build a chapel, designed by Jonas Virakas, to honor and remember the victims of the massacre.  However, as the Soviet Union reoccupied the area again in 1944, it was not built. Throughout the Soviet occupation, discussion of the massacre was suppressed, and it was not permitted to hold memorial services commemorating it.  Despite this, local people, under threat of arrest used to build crosses at the site of the Rainiai massacre; the crosses were periodically demolished by the Soviet authorities, only to spring up again.

The political organization Sąjūdis began to discuss the massacre more openly in 1988, during the glasnost policy of Soviet general secretary Mikhail Gorbachev.

After Lithuania regained its independence, a chapel designed by Algirdas Žebrauskas was built in the Telšiai cemetery. Funded by donations, it was built in 1991, and became one of the first memorials to be erected for the people who were killed by the Soviet authorities during the Soviet occupation of Lithuania (1940–1941 and 1944–1991).

Prosecutions

The perpetrators of the massacre continued to hold high positions in the Soviet Union; some were awarded various medals. Pyotr Raslan, for example, was employed as an official in the Soviet Ministry of Religious Affairs.

After the dissolution of the Soviet Union, those perpetrators who had remained in Lithuania, fled to Russia and Israel. Lithuania requested their extradition to put them on trial, which Russia has refused, saying of one he is 'too ill to be tried'. Some of the perpetrators have since died.

In 2001, the Šiauliai Area Court in northwest Lithuania issued a verdict finding a former officer of the NKVD, Pyotr Raslan, guilty of genocide against Lithuanian civilians and sentenced him in absentia, to life in prison.  He remained protected by the Russian authorities and in 2004, Vytautas Landsbergis, urged the Lithuanian President, to boycott the Victory Day celebrations in Moscow, for this reason (among other reasons).

Documentation
The massacre was well documented by both the Lithuanians and the Soviets. Examination of the bodies was done after the exhumation. The full account of the tortures and wounds inflicted on the victims was given by the surgeons who had examined the exhumed bodies, such as Dr. Leonardas Plechavičius and others. After the war Dr. Plechavičius delivered a speech before the US House of Representatives about the massacre. An investigation was carried out. In 1942 the first book about the massacre was published ("Rainių kankiniai"). The Soviet authorities attempted to document the events that took place in the first days after Germany invaded "Soviet" territory. Most of the communists of Lithuania had fled to Russia when the invasion began, some were asked to write their testimonies of the events. The Rainiai massacre was explained in the testimonies of the communists who were based in Telšiai. The leaders of Lithuanian SSR asked the perpetrators of the massacre to write these testimonies after Antanas Bimba, a Lithuanian communist who was living in United States and sending aid to USSR, found out about the massacre and demanded an explanation.

Gallery

References

Further reading 
"Telšiai Region. History and Cultural Heritage" - Adomas Butrimas.
"Telšių ir Kretingos kontrrevoliucionieriai fašistai ir jų siekimai" - A testimony of the events by Domas Rocius, a Lithuanian communist.
"Rainių kankiniai".
"Rainių tragedija" - Arvydas Anušauskas, Birutė Burauskaitė.

Massacres in 1941
Political repression in the Soviet Union
Political and cultural purges
Massacres committed by the Soviet Union
Massacres in the Soviet Union
People's Government of Lithuania
World War II massacres
Mass murder in 1941
1941 in Lithuania
Massacres in Lithuania
Soviet World War II crimes
NKVD
1941 in the Soviet Union
June 1941 events